Picard Island (also known as West Island) is an island in the Seychelles. It is the third largest island of the Aldabra Atoll in the Aldabra Group of islands, 1150 kilometers southwest of the country's capital, Victoria. The island covers an area of 9.29 km2.

This island forms the northwestern edge of the Aldabra atoll. It is separated from Grand Terre (South) Island in the south by the Passe Femme channel, which contains several small islands, and from Polymnieli Island in the west by Grand Passe. The atoll's only habitation is a scientific base (La Gigi) on Picard Island, which is now permanently occupied by 12 scientists.

See also

List of lighthouses in Seychelles

Gallery

References 

Lighthouses in Seychelles
Islands of Outer Islands (Seychelles)